The 1981 Wells Fargo Open was a women's tennis tournament played on outdoor hard courts at the Rancho Bernardo Inn in San Diego, California in the United States that was part of the Toyota Series of the 1981 WTA Tour. It was the fourth edition of the tournament and was held from July 27 through August 2, 1981. First-seeded Tracy Austin won the singles title, her third consecutive at the event, and earned $22,000 first-prize money.

Finals

Singles
 Tracy Austin defeated  Pam Shriver 6–2, 5–7, 6–2
 It was Austin's 3rd singles title of the year and the 24th of her career.

Doubles
 Kathy Jordan /  Candy Reynolds defeated  Rosie Casals /  Pam Shriver 6–1, 2–6, 6–4

Prize money

References

External links
 ITF tournament edition details
 Tournmanent draws

Wells Fargo Open
Southern California Open
Wells Fargo Open
Wells Fargo Open
Wells Fargo Open